Jeff Bell (born February 18, 1962) is an American executive. He is the CEO of PPLSI, an Ada, Oklahoma-based corporation that markets legal and privacy management services in the United States, the United Kingdom, and Canada. He also serves as chairman of the board of DOMedia LLC and as a venture partner of NCT Ventures LLC.

Bell worked at Ford Motor Company from 1991 to 2001, Chrysler  from 2001 to 2006, and Microsoft from 2006 to 2008, and has also worked for NBCUniversal. He has served on the boards of Kenyon College and the National Multiple Sclerosis Society.

Early life and education
Jeff Bell was born and raised in Oklahoma City. He attended college in Ohio, graduating from Kenyon College in 1984. Bell earned his Master's degree in international relations and economics from the Paul H. Nitze School of Advanced International Studies at Johns Hopkins University in 1988, and his MBA in finance and marketing from the Wharton School of the University of Pennsylvania in 1989.

Career
Bell's professional background is in consumer marketing and sales for global brands and companies, including the Ford Motor Company, Chrysler, Microsoft, and NBCUniversal. He joined Ford's new business development team in 1989 after graduating from Wharton. He held several positions during his tenure at Ford, including product and marketing manager of large cars from 1994 to 1996, general manager of fleet rental and leasing at Ford of Europe in 1997, and managing director of Ford Spain in 1999.

Bell left Ford in 2001 to join Chrysler, where he also held several executive positions. In his role as vice president of marketing communications, he oversaw advertising for the Chrysler, Dodge, and Jeep brands. Bell later served as vice president of the Chrysler and Jeep divisions, and has been credited with launching the Chrysler 300, select Jeep Wrangler and Chrysler Town & Country models, and the "grab life by the horns" marketing campaign. Bell led a product placement initiative to promote Chrysler vehicles in television programming and other media In 2005, Advertising Age named Bell and Chrysler "Interactive Marketer of the Year" and "Online Marketer of the Year", respectively. In February 2006, Bell became vice president of product strategy at Chrysler. While in that role he led a strategy to develop online games for the company.

Bell joined Microsoft in mid 2006 as corporate vice president of global marketing within the company's interactive entertainment business. He is credited with leading marketing campaigns for Gears of War and Halo 3. In 2007, Bell was named Advertising Age "Entertainment Marketer of the Year" and included in its "Marketing 50" list in 2008. Bell left Microsoft in mid 2008.

In 2012, Bell led NBCUniversal's marketing efforts in the health and fitness field, developing the "Challenge America" campaign. As of 2014, he was serving as a director of NCT Ventures.

On July 1, 2014, Bell was appointed CEO of LegalShield, a legal service product company, replacing Rip Mason, who began serving as executive chairman of the company's board.

Board service
Bell was named chairman of the Columbus, Ohio-based out-of-home advertising company DoMedia Columbus in May 2009, a position he continues to hold, as of 2014. He was also serving on Kenyon College's board of trustees in 2009. Bell has served on the National Multiple Sclerosis Society's board of directors, and also serves on the global advisory board of the Wharton Future of Advertising Program, which is affiliated with his alma mater, the Wharton School of the University of Pennsylvania. Bell is a member of Johns Hopkins University's School of Advanced International Studies Advisory Board

See also
 List of people from Oklahoma City

References

External links
 

1962 births
Living people
American chief executives
Businesspeople from Oklahoma City
Johns Hopkins University alumni
Kenyon College alumni
Wharton School of the University of Pennsylvania alumni